Trim Ademi (born 29 February 1992), known professionally as Capital T, is a Kosovo-Albanian rapper, singer, songwriter and philanthropist. Born and raised in Pristina, his uncle introduced him to music and rapping at an early age. He rose to recognition in the Albanian-speaking world, after the release of his first two albums Replay (2010) and KAPO (2012). Due to the success of his albums, he founded his own record label Authentic Entertainment.

Life and career

1992–2018: Early life and career beginnings 
Trim Ademi was born on 29 February 1992 into an Albanian family in the city of Pristina, then part of the Socialist Federal Republic of Yugoslavia, present Kosovo. His father, Agim Ademi, is a former professional football player and current president of the Football Federation of Kosovo. Ademi attended the Asim Vokshi Elementary School and enrolled, upon his graduation, at the Sami Frashëri High School in Pristina.
  
Ademi commenced his early music career in 2008 and debuted with the single "Shopping" by 2po2 featuring Capital T. The same year, he released his second single "1 Mëngjes" in collaboration with Albanian singer Adelina Thaqi. The following year, he released almost three singles including "Shum Nalt" in collaboration with 2po2 and Albanian singer Dafina Zeqiri. In 2010, he announced his debut studio album Replay and released the record in the same year. That year, he participated with Eni Koçi in the 11th edition of Kënga Magjike with the song "Diva". The singer released his debut studio album "Replay" in 2010, his second album "Kapo" in 2012 which was followed by his third album "Slumdog Millionaire" in 2015. His fourth album "Winter Is Here" was released through Authentic Entertainment in 2017 and achieved commercial success in Switzerland whereas it debuted on the Swiss Album Charts at number sixty-nine. In June 2016, he won the award for the "Video of the Year" at the Top Music Awards 2016.

2019–2020: Skulpturë 
In February 2019, Ademi released the follow-up single "Kujtime" and reached number 22 in Albania. Another pair of charting singles, "Hookah", "200 ditë" and "Akull", followed throughout the year with the latter peaking at number two in Albania and 64 in Switzerland. His later released singles, with artists such as Capital Bra, Ardian Bujupi and King Khalil, have charted in Germany, Austria and Switzerland. In 2019, Ademi released six singles throughout the year, including "Syt e tu", "Yalla" and "Akull", the latter reaching number two in Albania and sixty four in Switzerland. In July 2019, he collaborated with Albanian singer Elvana Gjata on her number one single "Fustani". In September 2019, he held his first concert titled "Time Capsule" at the Mother Teresa Square in Tirana.

In November 2019, he announced that he had started working on his upcoming fifth studio album Skulpturë. In January 2020, he released the lead single, "600Ps", from the aforementioned album. His second single from the album, "Je t'aime", followed a month later, in February 2020. In April 2020, he released his third single "FLEX", which was a great success. In May 2020 he published another single called "Flawless". In June 2020 he published a song featuring Ledri Vula, called DMP. In July 2020, Ademi started releasing songs from his album Skulpturë, first one was a feature with Jay1 called "Money", and the second one was "Tu Festu".

2021–present: Heartbroken Kids and continued success 
Ademi's upcoming fifth studio album, Heartbroken Kids, is scheduled to be released on 24 December 2021. Debuting at number 55 in Albania, "Plan" was released as the record's lead single in on 13 December. His follow-up single, "Nashta", is expected to be released on 21 December.

Activism  
Ademi has made contributions to various charitable causes throughout his career. In March 2019, he visited the Down Syndrome Association Kosovo to raise awareness and acceptance to people with the down syndrome. In November 2019, Ademi expressed his condolences via social media following the 6.4 magnitude earthquake in Albania. He subsequently went on to visit Albania to raise funds for rehabilitation, reconstruction and to support several campaigns. In December 2019, Ademi joined the UNDP Kosovo campaign #EcoKosovo, aiming to mobilise the country's population towards a healthier environment. In May 2020, he extended his support to the Black Lives Matter movement in connection with the wider George Floyd protests.

Discography 

 Replay (2010)
 Kapo (2012)
 Slumdog Millionaire (2015)
 Winter Is Here (2017)
 Skulpturë (2020)
 Heartbroken Kids (2021)

References 

1992 births
21st-century Albanian rappers
21st-century Albanian male singers
Albanian activists
Albanian songwriters
Albanian-language singers
Kosovo Albanians
Kosovan singers
Living people
Musicians from Pristina